Lakesite is a city in Hamilton County, Tennessee, United States. The population was 1,856 at the 2020 census. It is a northern suburb of the Chattanooga, TN–GA Metropolitan Statistical Area, located 15 miles north of the city.

Geography
Lakesite is located at  (35.205735, -85.136357).

Demographics

2020 census

As of the 2020 United States census, there were 1,856 people, 765 households, and 569 families residing in the city.

2000 census
As of the census of 2000, there were 1,845 people, 653 households, and 557 families residing in the city. The population density was 1,069.6 people per square mile (414.2/km2). There were 706 housing units at an average density of 409.3 per square mile (158.5/km2). The racial makeup of the city was 98.70% White, 0.60% African American, 0.38% Asian, and 0.33% from two or more races. Hispanic or Latino of any race were 0.43% of the population.

There were 653 households, out of which 41.2% had children under the age of 18 living with them, 73.8% were married couples living together, 9.0% had a female householder with no husband present, and 14.7% were non-families. 11.8% of all households were made up of individuals, and 3.1% had someone living alone who was 65 years of age or older. The average household size was 2.83 and the average family size was 3.07.

In the city, the population was spread out, with 27.4% under the age of 18, 6.7% from 18 to 24, 31.2% from 25 to 44, 25.9% from 45 to 64, and 8.8% who were 65 years of age or older. The median age was 38 years. For every 100 females, there were 96.7 males. For every 100 females age 18 and over, there were 93.8 males.

The median income for a household in the city was $54,219, and the median income for a family was $62,981. Males had a median income of $47,171 versus $26,111 for females. The per capita income for the city was $22,831. About 5.3% of families and 7.5% of the population were below the poverty line, including 8.0% of those under age 18 and 15.1% of those age 65 or over.

History

Lakesite was incorporated in 1972 from the efforts of Ray Dodson and Hans Bingham. Upon incorporating, the suburb consisted of 200 homes and a population of 500. In 1994 the neighborhood had grown to about 900 and residents petitioned the Lakesite City Commission for annexation. Upon the annexation, which was completed in mid-1995, the population grew to 1,499 and the land increased 66%.

Government

The government of Lakesite is run by a manager-commission charter. The commission consists of five members who are elected at-large for four-year terms. The commission then elects a mayor and a vice mayor. Each commission is assigned a chair position to oversee aspects of the city including public safety, budget and finance, parks and recreation, and public works.

Education
Lakesite is home to two schools: McConnell Elementary and Loftis Middle School.

References

Cities in Tennessee
Cities in Hamilton County, Tennessee
Cities in the Chattanooga metropolitan area
Tennessee populated places on the Tennessee River